Bweranyange (Mji wa kale wa Bweranyange in Swahili ) is  historic settlement located inside Karagwe District of Kagera Region in Tanzania. The settlement was established as the capital of the Karagwe Kingdom. The site is a registered National Historic Site.

References

Kagera Region